Sustainable Development Goal 3 (SDG 3 or Global Goal 3), regarding "Good Health and Well-being", is one of the 17 Sustainable Development Goals established by the United Nations in 2015. The official wording is: "To ensure healthy lives and promote well-being for all at all ages." The targets of SDG 3 cover and focus on various aspects of healthy life and healthy lifestyle. Progress towards the targets is measured using twenty-one indicators.

SDG 3 has 13 targets and 28 indicators to measure progress toward targets. The first nine targets are outcome targets. Those are: reduction of maternal mortality; ending all preventable deaths under five years of age; fight communicable diseases; ensure reduction of mortality from non-communicable diseases and promote mental health; prevent and treat substance abuse; reduce road injuries and deaths; grant universal access to sexual and reproductive care, family planning and education; achieve universal health coverage; and reduce illnesses and deaths from hazardous chemicals and pollution. The four means of implementation targets are:  implement the WHO Framework Convention on Tobacco Control; support research, development and universal access to affordable vaccines and medicines; increase health financing and support health workforce in developing countries; and improve early warning systems for global health risks. 

SDG 3 aims to achieve universal health coverage, that seeks equitable access of healthcare services to all men and women. It proposes to end the preventable death of newborns, infants and children under five (child mortality) and end epidemics.

Good health is essential to sustainable development and the 2030 Agenda. It focuses on broader economic and social inequalities, urbanization, climate crisis, continuing burden of HIV and other infectious diseases, not forgetting emerging challenges such as non-communicable diseases. Considering the global pandemic of COVID-19, there is a need to give significant attention towards the realization of good health and well being on a global scale.

Progress has been made in increasing life expectancy and reducing some of the common causes of child and maternal mortality. Between 2000 and 2016, the worldwide under-five mortality rate decreased by 47 percent (from 78 deaths per 1,000 live births to 41 deaths per 1,000 live births). Still, the number of children dying under age five is very high: 5.6 million in 2016.

Background 

The UNDP reports that "every 2 seconds, someone aged 30 to 70 years dies prematurely from noncommunicable diseases - cardiovascular disease, chronic respiratory disease, diabetes or cancer."

According to statistics, globally, "2.4 million children died in the first month of life in 2019 – approximately 6,700 neonatal deaths every day – with about a third of all neonatal deaths occurring within the first day after birth, and close to three-quarters occurring within the first week of life". Lack of access to quality healthcare is one of the major factors. Neonatal mortality was highest in sub-Saharan Africa and South Asia which post 27 and 25 deaths per 1,000 live births, respectively, in 2019.

Significant steps have been made in increasing life expectancy and reducing some of the common causes of child and maternal mortality. Between 2000 and 2016, the worldwide under-five mortality rate decreased by 47% (from 78 deaths per 1,000 live births to 41 deaths per 1,000 live births). Still, the number of children dying under age five is extremely high: 5.6 million in 2016 alone.

Targets, indicators, and progress 

The UN has defined 13 Targets and 28 Indicators for SDG 3. The main data source and maps for the indicators for SDG 3 come from Our World in Data's SDG Tracker. The targets of SDG 3 cover a wide range of issues including reduction of maternal mortality (Target 3.1), ending all preventable deaths under five years of age (Target 3.2), fight communicable diseases (Target 3.3), ensure a reduction of mortality from non-communicable diseases and promote mental health (Target 3.4), prevent and treat substance abuse (Target 3.5), reduce road injuries and deaths (Target 3.6), grant universal access to sexual and reproductive health care, family planning and education (Target 3.7), achieve universal health coverage (Target 3.8), reduce illnesses and deaths from hazardous chemicals and pollution (Target 3.9), implement the WHO Framework Convention on Tobacco Control (Target 3.a), support research, development and universal access to affordable vaccines and medicines (Target 3.b), increase health financing and support health workforce in developing countries (Target 3.c) and improve early warning systems for global health risks (Target 3.d).

Target 3.1: Reduce maternal mortality 

The full text of Target 3.1 is: "By 2030, reduce the global maternal mortality ratio to less than 70 per 100,000 live births".
 Indicator 3.1.1: Maternal mortality ratio. The maternal mortality ratio refers to the number of women who die from pregnancy-related causes while pregnant or within 42 days of pregnancy termination per 100,000 live births.
 Indicator 3.1.2: Percentage of births attended by personnel trained to give the necessary supervision, care, and advice to women during pregnancy, labour, and the postpartum period; to conduct deliveries on their own; and to care for newborns

Target 3.1 aims to reduce maternal mortality to less than 70 deaths per 100,000 live births. Though the maternal mortality ratio declined by 37 percent between 2000 and 2015, there were approximately 303,000 maternal deaths worldwide in 2015, most from preventable causes. In 2015, maternal health conditions were also the leading cause of death among girls aged 15–19. Key strategies for meeting SDG 3 will be to reduce adolescent pregnancy (which is strongly linked to gender equality), provide better data for all women and girls, and achieve universal coverage of skilled birth attendants.

Target 3.2: End all preventable deaths under five years of age 

The full text of Target 3.2 is: "By 2030, end preventable deaths of newborns and children under 5 years of age, with all countries aiming to reduce neonatal mortality to at least as low as 12 per 1,000 live births and under‑5 mortality to at least as low as 25 per 1,000 live births."
 Indicator 3.2.1: Under-5 mortality rate. The under-5 mortality rate measures the number of children per 1,000 live births who die before their fifth birthday.
 Indicator 3.2.2: Neonatal mortality rate. The neonatal mortality rate is defined as the share of newborns per 1,000 live births in a given year who die before reaching 28 days of age.

Globally, there is still a high risk for children dying before age five, even though improvements have been made. There are about 43 child deaths per 1,000 live births in 2015. This means that every day about 16,000 children under the age of five are dying (data from 2015).

Improving antenatal care programs could reduce the neonatal mortality rate.

Target 3.3: Fight communicable diseases 

The full text of Target 3.3 is: "By 2030, end the epidemics of AIDS, tuberculosis, malaria and neglected tropical diseases and combat hepatitis, water-borne diseases and other communicable diseases."
 Indicator 3.3.1: Number of new HIV infections per 1,000 uninfected population
 Indicator 3.3.2: Tuberculosis per 100,000 population
 Indicator 3.3.3: Malaria incidence per 1,000 population
 Indicator 3.3.4: Hepatitis B incidence per 100,000 population
 Indicator 3.3.5: Number of people requiring interventions against neglected tropical disease

Target 3.3 proposes to end the preventable death of newborns and children under five and to end epidemics such as AIDS, tuberculosis, malaria, and water-borne diseases, for example.

From 2000 to 2016, new HIV infections declined by 66 percent for children under 15 and by 45 percent among adolescents aged 15–19. 

In 2015, there were about 142 tuberculosis cases per 100,000 population.

Target 3.4: Reduce mortality from non-communicable diseases and promote mental health 
The full text of Target 3.4 is: "By 2030, reduce by one-third premature mortality from non-communicable diseases through prevention and treatment and promote mental health and well-being."
 Indicator 3.4.1: Mortality rate attributed to cardiovascular disease, cancer, diabetes or chronic respiratory disease
 Indicator 3.4.2: Suicide mortality rate

Deaths caused by the four main NCDs were "17.7 million from cardiovascular diseases, 8.8 million from cancers, 3.9 million from chronic respiratory diseases, and 1.6 million from diabetes".

Target 3.5: Prevent and treat substance abuse 
The full text of Target 3.5 is: "Strengthen the prevention and treatment of substance abuse, including narcotic drug abuse and harmful use of alcohol."
 Indicator 3.5.1: Coverage of treatment interventions (pharmacological, psychosocial and rehabilitation and aftercare services) for substance use disorders
 Indicator 3.5.2: Harmful use of alcohol, defined according to the national context as alcohol per capita consumption (aged 15 years and older) within a calendar year in litres of pure alcohol.

Target 3.6: Reduce road injuries and deaths 
The full text of Target 3.6 is: "By 2020, halve (50% less) the number of global deaths and injuries from road traffic accidents."

Target 3.6 has only one Indicator: Indicator 3.6.1 is the Death rate due to road traffic injuries.

The need for improvements in safer infrastructure and government regulation continues. In countries with great success, such as Sweden that boasts a 66% reduction in injury and deaths from 1990 to 2015, tough government regulation has been key. 

A Decade of Action for Road Safety 2011-2020 was declared in March 2010 by the United Nations General Assembly. In February 2020, the Stockholm Declaration that set a global target of reducing road traffic deaths and injuries by 50% by 2030. In August 2020, the United Nations ratified the Stockholm Declaration declaring 2021-2030 the Second Decade of action for Road Safety.

Target 3.7: Universal access to sexual and reproductive care, family planning and education 
The full text of Target 3.7 is: "By 2030, ensure universal access to sexual and reproductive health-care services, including for family planning, information and education, and the integration of reproductive health into national strategies and programs."
 Indicator 3.7.1: Percentage of married women ages 15–49 years whose need for family planning is satisfied with modern methods of contraception.
 Indicator 3.7.2: Adolescent birth rate (aged 10–14 years; aged 15–19 years) per 1,000 women in that age group.

For example, in West Africa twice as many women used contraceptives in 2020 compared to 2011.

Target 3.8: Achieve universal health coverage 
The full text of Target 3.8 is: "Achieve universal health coverage, including financial risk protection, access to quality essential health-care services and access to safe, effective, quality and affordable essential medicines and vaccines for all."
 Indicator 3.8.1: Coverage of essential health services.
 Indicator 3.8.2: Proportion of population with large household expenditures on health as a share of total household expenditure or income
Universal Health Coverage (UHC) includes migrants and refugees, even if they do not have legal status.

Primary health care (PHC) is important for universal health coverage. It's usually accessible and affordable.

Target 3.9: Reduce illnesses and deaths from hazardous chemicals and pollution 
The full text of Target 3.9 is: "By 2030, substantially reduce the number of deaths and illnesses from hazardous chemicals and air, water and soil pollution and contamination."
 Indicator 3.9.1: Mortality rate attributed to the household (indoor) and ambient (outdoor) air pollution.
 Indicator 3.9.2: Mortality rate attributed to unsafe water, sanitation, and lack of hygiene.
 Indicator 3.9.3: Mortality rate attributed to unintentional poisoning.
Household air pollution is estimated to cause half of all pneumonia deaths among children under age five.

Target 3.a: Implement the WHO framework convention on tobacco control 
The full text of Target 3.a is: "Strengthen the implementation of the World Health Organization Framework Convention on Tobacco Control in all countries, as appropriate."

Target 3.a has only one Indicator: Indicator 3.a.1 is the "age-standardized prevalence of current tobacco use among persons aged 15 years and older".

The WHO Framework Convention on Tobacco Control has been ratified by the great majority of countries (180 countries).

In 2019 the global average value for the "age-standardized smoking prevalence among ages 15 and older" was 17%, down from nearly 25% in 1990, which is a positive development.

Target 3.b: Support research, development and universal access to affordable vaccines and medicines 

The full text of Target 3.b is: "Support the research and development of vaccines and medicines for the communicable and non‑communicable diseases that primarily affect developing countries, provide access to affordable essential medicines and vaccines, in accordance with the Doha Declaration on the TRIPS Agreement and Public Health, which affirms the right of developing countries to use to the full the provisions in the Agreement on Trade-Related Aspects of Intellectual Property Rights regarding flexibilities to protect public health, and, in particular, provide access to medicines for all."
 Indicator 3.b.1: Proportion of the target population covered by all vaccines included in their national program.
 Indicator 3.b.2: Total net official development assistance (ODA) to medical research and basic health sectors.
 Indicator 3.b.3: Proportion of health facilities that have a core set of relevant essential medicines available and affordable on a sustainable basis.
A review in 2017 pointed out that "as little as 1% of all funding for health R&D is allocated to diseases that are predominantly incident in developing countries".

SDG 3 aims to achieve universal health coverage, including access to essential medicines and vaccines. Around two in five countries will need to accelerate progress in order to reach SDG targets for immunization. Immunization averts an estimated 2 million to 3 million deaths every year.

Target 3.c: Increase health financing and support health workforce in developing countries 
The full text of Target 3.c is: "Substantially increase health financing and the recruitment, development, training and retention of the health workforce in developing countries, especially in the least developed countries and small island developing states."

Target 3.c has only one Indicator: Indicator 3.c.1 is the Health worker density and distribution.

There is a joint ITU/WHO initiative "Be Healthy Be Mobile" which brings mobile health services to scale.

Target 3.d: Improve early warning systems for global health risks 
The full text of Target 3.d is: "Strengthen the capacity of all countries, in particular developing countries, for early warning, risk reduction and management of national and global health risks."
 Indicator 3.d.1: International Health Regulations (IHR) capacity and health emergency preparedness
 Indicator 3.d.2: Percentage of bloodstream infections due to selected antimicrobial resistant organisms.

Custodian agencies 
Custodian agencies are in charge of reporting on the following indicators:

 Indicators 3.1.1, 3.2.1, 3.2.2, 3.4.1, 3.4.2, 3.5.2, 3.6.1, 3.8.2, 3.9.1, 3.9.2, 3.9.3, 3.b.3, 3.c.1, 3.d.1 and 3.d.2: World Health Organization (WHO).
 Indicator 3.1.2: United Nations International Children's Emergency Fund (UNICEF)
 Indicator 3.3.1: Joint United Nations Programme on HIV/AIDS
 Indicators 3.3.2, 3.3.3, 3.3.4 and 3.3.5: UNICEF.
 Indicator 3.5.1: the World Health Organisation and the United Nations Office on Drugs and Crime.
 Indicators 3.7.1 and 3.7.2: United Nations Department of Economic and Social Affairs.
 Indicators 3.8.1 and 3.b.1: WHO and UNICEF.
 Indicator 3.b.2: Organisation for Economic Co-operation and Development (OECD).

Monitoring progress 
An annual report is prepared by the Secretary-General of the United Nations evaluating the progress towards the Sustainable Development Goals. 

A 2018 study in the journal Nature found that while "nearly all African countries demonstrated improvements for children under 5 years old for stunting, wasting, and underweight... much, if not all of the continent will fail to meet the Sustainable Development Goal target—to end malnutrition by 2030".

Challenges

Impact of COVID-19 pandemic 

The COVID-19 pandemic is a serious threat to the progress of SDG 3 aimed to ensure healthy lives and well-being for all. As the pandemic spread worldwide, the lockdown had over 70 countries putting a hold on various health services such as child vaccination, family planning, and cancer screening. The pandemic has also led to overloading and overcrowding of health facilities and many people became afraid of visiting for fear of being infected.

Most non-COVID-19 diseases have been either neglected or interrupted and healthcare systems are in turn stretched beyond their capacity and capabilities to provide adequate care. This is a great reverse in decades of improvement and has reiterated the need for governments to prioritize issues of healthy living and well-being and work towards the goal of SDG 3. 

The governments of countries who already suffer from health workers shortage and other healthcare systems should take advantage of the lessons learnt during this crisis and build up resilience to combat future health pandemics and achieve progress towards Universal Health Coverage.

Links with other SDGs 
The targets of SDG 3 link to targets in other goals: For example to some targets of SDG 2, SDG 4, SDG 5, SDG 6 etc.

Organizations 
Organizations dedicated to good health and well-being include: 
 The Global Fund to Fight AIDS
 Joint United Nations Program on HIV/AIDS (UNAIDS)
 World Bank 
 World Health Organization (WHO) 
 UNICEF
 Department of Economic and Social Affairs (DESA)
 United Nations Office on Drugs and Crime (UNODC)
 Organisation for Economic Co-operation and Development (OECD)
 UN Women
 Gavi the Vaccine Alliance
 Vodafone Foundation
 Doctors Without Borders
 Red Cross International
 Medical IMPACT
 Partners in Health
 PanAfricare
 The Global Health Network

References

External links 

 UN Sustainable Development Knowledge Platform – SDG 3
 “Global Goals” Campaign - SDG 3
 SDG-Track.org - SDG 3
 UN SDG 3 in the US

Sustainable development
Sustainable Development Goals